BioDrugs is a peer-reviewed pharmacology journal. BioDrugs covers the development and therapeutic application of biotechnology-based pharmaceuticals and diagnostic products for the treatment of human disease. It has a 2021 impact factor of 7.744. It is published by Adis International (SpringerNature).

References

Pharmacology journals
Publications established in 1997
English-language journals
Bimonthly journals